Ivan Markov (Bulgarian: Иван Марков; born 14 September 1988) is a Bulgarian weightlifter competing in the 85 kg category. He is the younger brother of former world champion weightlifter Georgi Markov. He placed fifth at the 2012 Summer Olympics. Markov also qualified for the 2008 Summer Olympics but he was one of eleven Bulgarian weightlifters who tested positive for a banned steroid two months prior to the games. Bulgaria withdrew its whole team from the Olympic competition and Markov received a four-year ban from competition.

References

External links
 
 
 

1988 births
Bulgarian sportspeople in doping cases
Bulgarian male weightlifters
Doping cases in weightlifting
Living people
Olympic weightlifters of Bulgaria
Weightlifters at the 2012 Summer Olympics
World Weightlifting Championships medalists
European Weightlifting Championships medalists
21st-century Bulgarian people